Chander Bari is a 2007 Bengali film directed by Tarun Majumdar. The film centers on a middle class joint family. The film is based on a Bengali story written by Pracheta Gupta. Majumdar used some Rabindra Sangeets in this film.

Plot
The Sanyals are a large extended family composed of the nonagenarian grandfather, (Haradhan Banerjee), his son (Ranjit Mallick), daughter-in-law (Laboni Sarkar) who rules over the house like a female Hitler, reincarnated, and their children of whom two, a daughter (Koel Mallick) and son (Rishi Kaushik) live together in a beautiful mansion in Bhawanipur. There seems to be more servants in their house than family members, extending the virtues and parameters of the ideal ‘joint’ family. The film starts with everyone being excited about the return of the elder son (Babul Supriyo) from US, where he had gone for some business related work. However, all hell breaks loose, when he returns with a wife (Rituparna Sengupta) and her child from a former marriage in tow. Her first husband with underworld links was killed in police crossfire. Everyone accepts the new additions to the Sanyal family except the mother-in-law who refuses to even acknowledge her presence. The story revolves around how these two women build bridges to keep the joint family intact, with most of the credit going to the beautiful daughter-in-law.

Cast
Ranjit Mallick
Laboni Sarkar
Babul Supriyo
Rituparna Sengupta
Rishi Kaushik
Soumitra Chatterjee
Tathoi Deb
Soham Chakraborty
Aritra Dutta Banik
Koel Mallick 
Dwijen Bandopadhyay
Sarbori Mukherjee
Sumit Samadder
Shritama Bhattacharjee
Tanima Sen
Swanakamal Dutta
Shraboni Bonik 
Chaitali Mukhopadhyay 
Payel Deb
Oindrila Saha

Music
Some of the tracks used in this film were from Rabindra Sangeet.
"Bhenge Mor Ghar Er Chabi"
"Chand Er Hashir Bnadh Bhengechhe"
"Gun Gun Nhromora Boslo Eshe"
"Bandh Bhenge Dao"
"Debo Na, Debo Na Sara To Jotoi Dako" (Singer: Jojo, Sujay Bhowmick)

References

External links

2007 films
Bengali-language Indian films
Films based on Indian novels
2000s Bengali-language films